Mistral (L9013) is an amphibious assault ship, a type of helicopter carrier, of the French Navy. She is the fourth vessel to bear the name, and is the lead ship of the  amphibious assault ships.

Construction and career 

Mistral began sea trials in January 2005, and was commissioned in February 2006. She departed from Toulon for her first long-range journey in March, sailing through the Mediterranean Sea, Suez Canal, and the Red Sea to Djibouti and India, before returning to France. In July, to ensure the safety of European citizens in the context of the 2006 Israel-Lebanon conflict, France set up Opération Baliste.

On 16 May 2008, the Burmese United Nations (UN) ambassador accused France of deploying Mistral to the Burmese coast for military purposes. The French UN ambassador denied this, stating that she was instead carrying 1,500 tons of relief supplies.

In March 2011 Mistral was deployed to Libyan waters to help aid the joint NATO effort to repatriate tens of thousands of Egyptian refugees fleeing the violence in Libya.

References

Further reading
</ref>

External links

  BPC Mistral  Force Projection and Command Ship Mistral on Alabordache
  BPC Mistral Force Projection and Command Ship Mistral

Mistral-class amphibious assault ships
Amphibious warfare vessels of France
2004 ships
Ships built in France

fr:Classe Mistral